

Musicians and Instruments
As listed on Terri's site.

 Terri Hendrix: Vocals, Harmony Vocals, Guitar, Harmonica, Mandolin, Papoose
 Lloyd Maines: Harmony Vocals, Guitar, Mandolin, Dobro, Steel, Papoose, Banjo
 Glenn Fukunaga: Bass, Upright Bass
 Paul Pearcy: Drums, Percussion
 Adam Odor: Accordion
 Riley Osbourn: Keyboards
 Matt Wiedemann: Drum Programming, Samples
 Bonnie Whitmore: Cello
 Eleanor Whitmore: Violin
 Bonnie and Eleanor: Harmony Vocals on Breakdown
 Ruthie Foster and Cyd Cassone: Harmony Vocals on Judgment Day and Monopoly

Track listing
 Breakdown
 Enjoy The Ride
 It's About Time
 One Way
 Judgement Day
 Monopoly
 One Night Stand
 I Need Love
 Jeannie's Song
 Quiet Me
 Long Ride Home
 Hey Now

2004 albums
Terri Hendrix albums